John K. Hale (1807–May 23, 1879) was an American lawyer and politician from New York.

Life
He was the son of John Hale and Mary (Jones) Hale. He was born in the Northern part of the District of Maine, then part of Massachusetts. In 1828, he married a daughter of J. Hall, of Portland, Maine.

Hale studied law with William G. Angel.

Hale removed to Addison, and in 1836 to Hornellsville, both in Steuben County, New York.

He was a member of the New York State Assembly (Steuben Co., 3rd D.) in 1849.

He was a member of the New York State Senate (26th D.) in 1856 and 1857. He moved to Wyandotte County, Kansas in 1863 and formed a law partnership with Kansas attorney A. B. Bartlett. For several years they were the leading law firm in that city, having a large and lucrative practice, including representation of the Kansas Pacific Railway.

His wife's sister Eleanor (1809–1877) was married to the controversial author John Neal (1793–1876). In his later years, Hale had a stroke of paralysis, from which he never fully recovered. He died at the home of his daughter in Cortland, New York.

References

Sources
The New York Civil List compiled by Franklin Benjamin Hough (pages 137, 141, 237 and 278; Weed, Parsons and Co., 1858)
Pen and Ink Portraits of the Senators, Assemblymen, and State Officers of New York by G. W. Bungay (1857; pg. 31)
American Biographical Panorama by William Hunt (Albany, 1849; pg. 354f)
John Augustus Hale (his nephew) transcribed from Kansas: a Cyclopedia of State History etc. (Chicago, 1912)

1807 births
Year of death missing
Members of the New York State Assembly
New York (state) state senators
New York (state) Know Nothings
19th-century American politicians
People from Addison, New York
People from Wyandotte County, Kansas
19th-century American railroad executives
People from Hornellsville, New York